I Delet

Delete e is the 16th album released by T. V. Smith on November 17, 2014.

Track listing
All tracks composed by T. V. Smith
"Replay"
"I Delete"
"First One to Sign Up"
"Long Gone"
"Cutbacks"
"London Hum"
"Festival of Fools"
"It Don't Work"
"Home Time"
"A Step Back"

Personnel
T. V. Smith - guitar, keyboards, vocals
B.B. Quattro - bass, backing vocals
Steve "Vom" Ritchie - drums, percussion

References

2014 albums